"Slight Return" is a song by English indie rock band the Bluetones, released as the second single from their 1996 debut album, Expecting to Fly. Re-released as a solo single on 22 January 1996, it was originally issued as a double-A-side with "The Fountainhead" the previous year. "Slight Return" peaked at number two on the UK Singles Chart and is the band's highest-placing single. Bluetones frontman Mark Morriss said that the title of the song was initially a nickname, but as he was not good with naming songs, it eventually became the official title.

Track listings
UK 7-inch and cassette single, European CD single
 "Slight Return"
 "Don't Stand Me Down"

UK and Australian CD single
 "Slight Return"
 "Don't Stand Me Down"
 "Nae Hair On't"

US CD single
 "Slight Return"
 "Don't Stand Me Down"
 "Nae Hair On't"
 "Are You Blue or Are You Blind?"

Credits and personnel
Credits are taken from the Expecting to Fly album booklet.

Studio
 Recorded in mid-1995 at Ridge Farm Studios (Surrey, England)

Personnel

 Mark Morriss – writing, vocals
 Eds Chesters – writing, drums, percussion
 Adam Devlin – writing, six-string guitar, twelve-string guitar
 Scott Morriss – writing, vocals, electric bass guitar
 Hugh Jones – production, mixing
 Helen Woodward – mix engineering
 Geoff Pesche – mastering

Charts

Weekly charts

Year-end charts

Certifications

References

1996 singles
1996 songs
A&M Records singles
The Bluetones songs
Music videos directed by Lindy Heymann
Song recordings produced by Hugh Jones (producer)
Songs written by Adam Devlin
Songs written by Eds Chesters
Songs written by Mark Morriss
Songs written by Scott Morriss